Uran City railway station is a proposed railway station in Raigad district, Maharashtra. Its code is UNCT. It serves Uran City a node of Navi Mumbai.

In 1995, CIDCO has implemented a six-corridor railway project including the Mankhurd–CBD Belapur–Panvel Railway Line and Panvel/CBD Belapur–Uran Railway Line with an expenditure on a ratio of 67:33; ₹466 crore (US$69 million) from Indian Railways and ₹946 crore (US$140 million) from CIDCO.

The Uran railway station will lie on Panvel/Belapur–Uran Corridor Line was originally planned in 1996, but later it was halted due to unknown reasons in 2008.

References

Railway stations in Raigad district
Mumbai CR railway division
Transport in Navi Mumbai
Proposed railway stations in India
Mumbai Suburban Railway stations
Proposed infrastructure in Maharashtra